Trinity County is the name of two counties in the United States:

 Trinity County, California
 Trinity County, Texas